Jeff McKissack, a mail carrier in Houston, Texas, transformed a small suburban lot near his wood-frame house into The Orange Show in honor of his favorite fruit.

Importance

The Orange Show has evolved into the Orange Show Center for Visionary Art and since 1980 is a non-profit organization. 
As a form of folk art, The Orange Show captures a segment of late 20th Century American culture.  Programming at the Orange Show is for both children and adults and includes hands-on workshops, music, storytelling and performance, the Eyeopener Tour program and Houston's most popular public art event, the Houston Art Car Parade.

The foundation has grown to take in other folk art icons and now possesses and runs the  Beer Can House. In addition, it is currently constructing Houston's first folk art inspired green space, Smither Park, in the land adjacent to the Orange Show Monument.

See also
 List of public art in Houston

References

American folk art
Visionary environments
Culture of Houston
Tourist attractions in Houston
Outdoor sculptures in Houston
Buildings and structures in Houston
National Register of Historic Places in Houston
Buildings and structures on the National Register of Historic Places in Texas